HMAS Broome (J191), named for the town of Broome, Western Australia, was one of 60 Bathurst-class corvettes constructed during World War II and one of 20 built for the Admiralty but manned by personnel of and commissioned into the Royal Australian Navy (RAN).

Design and construction

In 1938, the Australian Commonwealth Naval Board (ACNB) identified the need for a general purpose 'local defence vessel' capable of both anti-submarine and mine-warfare duties, while easy to construct and operate. Construction of the prototype  did not go ahead, but the plans were retained. The need for locally built 'all-rounder' vessels at the start of World War II saw the "Australian Minesweepers" (designated as such to hide their anti-submarine capability, but popularly referred to as "corvettes") approved in September 1939, with 60 constructed during the course of the war: 36 ordered by the RAN, 20 (including Broome) ordered by the British Admiralty but manned and commissioned as RAN vessels, and 4 for the Royal Indian Navy.

Broome was laid down by Evans Deakin and Company at Brisbane on 3 May 1941, launched on 6 October 1941 by Mrs. M. J. McKew, wife of the shipyard's works manager, and commissioned on 29 July 1942.

Operational history
The corvette operated during World War II, and was awarded the battle honours "Pacific 1942-45" and "New Guinea 1942-44" for her service.

HMAS Broome paid off on 24 August 1946, was sold to the Turkish Navy and renamed Alanya. The vessel left Turkish service in 1975. The ship's bell was recovered before the sale, and returned to Broome. It was presented to the Broome Road Board in June 1952, who then passed the bell on to Broome State School in November. The bell later ended up at the town's Returned and Services League club.

Citations

References
Books

Journal and news articles

Bathurst-class corvettes of the Royal Australian Navy
Ships built in Queensland
World War II corvettes of Australia
1941 ships
Bathurst-class corvettes of the Turkish Navy
Corvettes of the Cold War